Michal Trávník (born 17 May 1994) is a professional Czech football defensive midfielder currently playing for Slovácko, on loan from Sparta Prague, and the Czech Republic national team.

Club career 
Trávník made his professional league debut for Slovácko in their 2–2 Czech First League draw at České Budějovice on 18 March 2012. He scored his first league goal in Slovácko's 2–0 home win against Znojmo on 10 May 2014. He moved to another Czech First League team, Jablonec, in July 2015.

International career 
Trávník played for the Czech Republic on all youth levels from Under-17 up and took part in the FIFA U-17 World Cup and the 2015 UEFA European Under-21 Championship. He made his debut for the senior Czech Republic team in their 0–2 loss to Uruguay in the 2018 China Cup.

Career statistics

Club

References

External links 
 
 Michal Trávník official international statistics
 

Czech footballers
Czech Republic youth international footballers
Czech Republic under-21 international footballers
Czech Republic international footballers
1994 births
Living people
Czech First League players
1. FC Slovácko players
FK Jablonec players
Association football midfielders
AC Sparta Prague players
Kasımpaşa S.K. footballers
Expatriate footballers in Turkey
Czech expatriate sportspeople in Turkey